Ian Pino Soler (born 23 January 1996) is a Spanish footballer who plays as a central defender.

Club career
Born in Prats de Lluçanès, Barcelona, Catalonia, Pino represented Damm, Espanyol and Almería before moving abroad with Fulham on 5 September 2015. After only playing for the club's under-23 squad, he returned to his home country the following July after agreeing to a contract with Segunda División B side Jumilla.

Pino made his senior debut on 11 September 2016, coming on as a substitute in a 2–0 home win against Real Murcia. On 11 January of the following year, he moved to Málaga and was assigned to the reserves in Tercera División.

Pino scored his first senior goal on 22 January 2017, netting his team's fourth in a 4–3 defeat of Motril. He made his first team debut on 28 November, starting in a 1–1 home draw against Numancia for the season's Copa del Rey.

On 18 February 2022, Pino Soler signed with USL Championship side Louisville City. On 9 March 2023, Soler and Lousville mututally agreed to terminate his contract to allow him to return to Europe.

References

External links

1996 births
Living people
People from Osona
Sportspeople from the Province of Barcelona
Spanish footballers
Footballers from Catalonia
Association football defenders
Segunda División B players
Tercera División players
Atlético Malagueño players
Málaga CF players
Fulham F.C. players
Spanish expatriate footballers
Spanish expatriate sportspeople in England
Expatriate footballers in England
CF Damm players
FC Jumilla players
MFK Zemplín Michalovce players
Zagłębie Lubin players
Slovak Super Liga players
Ekstraklasa players
Expatriate footballers in Slovakia
Expatriate footballers in Poland
Spanish expatriate sportspeople in Slovakia
Louisville City FC players
Expatriate soccer players in the United States
Spanish expatriate sportspeople in the United States
USL Championship players